LaDell Andersen (October 25, 1929 – December 29, 2019) was an American college and professional basketball coach.

Career
Born in Malad City, Idaho, Andersen attended Utah State University, where he became a member of the Sigma Chi fraternity.  He was an All-Skyline Conference and an honorable mention All-American basketball player in 1951.   He was also invited and competed in the 1952 United States Men's Olympic Basketball Team tryouts in New York City.

Andersen was hired in 1956 as an assistant coach for University of Utah coach Jack Gardner.  Andersen left the Utes in 1961 to become head coach of his alma mater.

During his tenure as the Aggies head coach, Utah State made four appearances in the NCAA basketball tournament including a trip to the Elite Eight in 1970, losing to eventual champion UCLA.  Andersen also led them to two appearances in the National Invitation Tournament.  He compiled a record of 176–96 (.647) at the school from 1961 to 1971.  Former LSU coaching great Dale Brown served as an assistant coach during Andersen's tenure. Andersen recommended Brown as his successor, but when USU officials rejected the idea, Brown went to Washington State for one season as an assistant before succeeding Press Maravich as LSU's coach, where he remained for 25 seasons (1972–97), compiling a 448–301 record.

Andersen was also the head coach of the American Basketball Association's Utah Stars for two seasons (1971–72 and 1972–73).  Andersen had success with the team and led them to two Western Division regular season titles but both seasons were ended by the Indiana Pacers in the Western Division playoff finals.  Andersen compiled a 115–43 (.684) regular season coaching record with the Stars.  Despite his success with the Stars, Andersen resigned after his second season with the team.

He returned to Utah State University and was appointed as the school's athletic director in 1973. Andersen held the post for ten years until he was lured back into coaching again in 1983 for Brigham Young University (BYU).

Andersen coached the Cougars for six years and compiled a 114–71 (.616) record.  BYU made four post season appearances including three in the NCAA basketball tournament and one in the National Invitation Tournament.  He resigned as BYU head coach in 1989 and was replaced by Roger Reid.

Andersen continued to be involved in basketball acting as a scout and consultant for the NBA's Utah Jazz organization, partly because of his connections with former Utah State player and longtime Jazz assistant Phil Johnson. It is believed that he was the person who scouted John Stockton and encouraged the Jazz to draft him when they did.

Andersen died on December 29, 2019, at age 90.

Honors
 Member of the Utah Sports Hall of Fame
 Named one of the Top 100 Most Accomplished People in the State of Utah, 1888–1998

Head coaching record

College

References

External links
 Basketball Reference.com page

1929 births
2019 deaths
Amateur Athletic Union men's basketball players
American men's basketball players
Basketball coaches from Idaho
Basketball players from Idaho
BYU Cougars men's basketball coaches
People from Malad City, Idaho
Utah Jazz scouts
Utah Stars coaches
Utah State Aggies athletic directors
Utah State Aggies men's basketball coaches
Utah State Aggies men's basketball players
Utah Utes men's basketball coaches